is one of the ten wards in Sapporo city, Japan. The ward was split from Shiroishi-ku on November 6, 1989.

History
1871: Shiroishi village was founded.
1873: Kamishiroishi village split off from Shiroishi village.
1902: Shiroishi village and kamishiroishi village were merged to form Shiroishi village.
1950: Shiroishi village was merged into Sapporo city.
1972: Sapporo was designated as one of the cities designated by government ordinance and Shiroishi-ku was established.
1989: Atsubetsu-ku split off from Shiroishi-ku.

Transportation

Rail
 JR Hokkaido
 Hakodate Main Line: Shinrin-Kōen - Atsubetsu
 Chitose Line: Shin-Sapporo - Kami-Nopporo
 Sapporo Municipal Subway
 Tōzai Line: Ōyachi - Hibarigaoka - Shin-Sapporo

Road
 Dō-Ō Expressway: Sapporo-minami IC
 Route 12

Education

University
 Hokusei Gakuen University

College
 Hokusei Gakuen University Junior College

High schools

Public
 Hokkaido Sapporo Atsubetsu High School
 Hokkaido Sapporo Keisei High School
 Hokkaido Sapporo Higashi Commercial High School

Private
 Hokusei Gakuen University High School

Mascot 

Atsubetsu's mascot is  who is a scarecrow. It resides in Nopporo Forest Park since its discovery on February 4, 2005. It loves to play children in any occasions like festivals and eat festival food. Its favourite colours are yellow, green and blue because they relate to the bright city and its rich nature and clear skies. Its gender and age is still unknown. It is designed by Kumiko Isobata and Nakade Wakana.

See also
 Nopporo Shinrin Kōen Prefectural Natural Park
 Sapporo Atsubetsu Park Stadium

References

External links
 Atsubetsu ward office 

Wards of Sapporo